Beyg may refer to:
Qaleh Beyg Qarah Cheshmeh
Beyk, placename
Bey, title for a chieftain